Fight the Bear are a ska/rock band. Their debut full-length album, Gutter Love, was released in 2006. Their second studio album, Dead Sea Fruit, was released in 2009. The band's third album, 38 Degrees, was released on 30 August 2013.

Members

Current members 
Jonny Keeley – vocals, guitar
Jamie Furber – vocals, guitar
Bear – bass
Dunk Burns – drums

Discography

Studio albums 
 Gutter Love (2006)
 Dead Sea Fruit (2009)
 38 Degrees (2013)

References

External links 
 Fight the Bear official website

English ska musical groups
Musical groups from Shropshire